H.G. Stephenson Ltd  are an independent distributor of crockery, glassware, cutlery and other tableware, based in Stockport, Greater Manchester, England.

More commonly known as 'Stephensons', the company is owned and run by the fifth generation of the family. Henry George Stephenson established Stephensons in 1860 when he rented a stall in Salford flat iron markets before moving into the newly built Barton Arcade. The company moved to Kennerley Works (Stockport) in 1967 after 99 years in Manchester.

In 2013, the company expanded their Stockport site  by investing in neighbouring premises, previously occupied by Piggott & Whitfield Ltd, which saw the site grow to over 30,000 sq ft. In November 2015, Stephensons responded to online growth by acquiring a 13,500 sq.ft. warehouse  to enhance buying power and customer service.

In November 2018, 150 years after the company was established at Barton Arcade, H.G. Stephenson Ltd were named as the Manchester Evening News Business of the Year  in the £10-25 Million Turnover Category.

History timeline

1860 - Henry George Stephenson moved to Manchester and sold pottery at the Salford Flat Iron Market.  

1868 - Henry moved into Manchester’s newly built Barton Arcade.

1900 - The company registered with Companies House.

1914 - Business continued to thrive until the advent of The Great War which brought major recession and limited supplies.

1918 - Henry died leaving his sixth son, Ernest, to guide the business past The Great War.

1919 - Miss Anne Smith joined Stephensons aged 14. Anne worked for the company for 70 years to become the longest serving employee.

1939 - Harold Stephenson, son of Ernest, was elected to the board.

1943 - Stephensons closed for the duration of World War II after a bombing raid severely damaged Barton Arcade.

1945 - Barton Arcade reopened, although supplies of anything more than plain white earthenware and basic glass remained virtually impossible to find until the 1950s.

1966 - Ernest retired at the age of 75 as Harold took full control of the company.

1967 - After 99 years at Barton Arcade, Stephensons relocated to Kennerley Works in Stockport. 

1970 - Michael Stephenson became Managing Director in 1970. He reintroduces retail sales and begins building the business as a one-stop-shop for catering and hospitality equipment.

1994 - The Stephensons Showroom is built to coincide with the business' reintroduction of retail. It is moved and expanded in 1998. 

1998 - Julian Lewis-Booth, Michael’s eldest son, joined Stephensons as Sales Director.

2005 - Julian’s brother, Henry, joined the business as Marketing Director and would later become Managing Director.

2006 - The Stephensons website was launched to propel the company into the 21st century.

2013 - The Kennerley Works site was expanded to over 30,000 square feet.

2015 - Stephensons acquired a 13,500 square foot warehouse in Cheadle. 

2018 - The business celebrates its sesquicentennial (150 Year) anniversary and is named as Business of the Year by the Manchester Evening News.

References

External links
 Official website

Companies based in Stockport
Catering and food service companies of the United Kingdom